Jordan Kerr and Rajeev Ram were the defending champions, but chose not to compete with each other.
Kerr chose to compete with Ross Hutchins, but they got out in the first round to Jonathan Erlich and Scott Lipsky.
Ram chose to compete with Jean-Julien Rojer. However, they lost in the first round to Marc Gicquel and Santiago Ventura.
Unseeded Carsten Ball and Chris Guccione won in the final 6–3, 6–4, against Santiago González and Travis Rettenmaier.

Seeds

Draw

Draw

External links
Draw

Doubles